{{Infobox CBB Team
|current = 2022–23 UT Rio Grande Valley Vaqueros men's basketball team
|name = UTRGV Vaqueros men's basketball
|logo = Utrgv athletics primary logo.png
|logo_size = 250
|university = University of Texas Rio Grande Valley
|conference = Western Athletic Conference
|location = Edinburg, Texas
|coach = Matt Figger
|tenure = 1st
|arena = UTRGV Fieldhouse
|capacity = 2,500
|nickname = Vaqueros
|h_pattern_b=_bb_trimnumbersonwhite|h_body=fc4c02 |h_shorts=fc4c02 |h_pattern_s=_blanksides2
|a_pattern_b=_bb_whitetrimnumbers|a_body=fc4c02 |a_shorts=fc4c02 |a_pattern_s=_whitesides
|NCAAchampion = 1963†
|NCAArunnerup = 1964†
|NCAAfinalfour = 1963†, 1964†
|NCAAeliteeight = 1963†, 1964†
|NCAAsweetsixteen = 1962†, 1963†, 1964†, 1968*
|NCAAsecondround = 
|NCAAtourneys = 1962†, 1963†, 1964†, 1968**at Division II level† as NAIA member| nit_appearance        = 1981
}}

The UT Rio Grande Valley Vaqueros men's basketball team, or UTRGV Vaqueros, represents the University of Texas Rio Grande Valley in Edinburg, Texas, United States. The school's team currently competes in the Western Athletic Conference. They play their home games at the UTRGV Fieldhouse. The Vaqueros are one of 45 Division I programs to have never appeared in the NCAA Division I men's basketball tournament.

The team's current identity was established after the University of Texas at Brownsville and the University of Texas–Pan American (UTPA) were merged in 2015. The merged university inherited the athletic legacy of UTPA, including its WAC membership. Before the merger, UTPA's teams were known as the “Broncs.”

History

Beginnings (1952–1958)
The Broncs first began play in 1952 under their then-current institutional identity of Pan American College, as a member of the National Association of Intercollegiate Athletics. In their first ever season (coached by L.A. Youngman), the Broncs finished 11–10. They joined the Big State Conference before the next season, but the Broncs finished 6–11 overall with an 0–6 conference record. Harry Meng took over the team the next two seasons, but he did not fare any better, going 2–20 and 4–20 in his two seasons. John Donnelly took over as coach, serving from 1956 to 1958, with his tenure marked by 4–16 and 5–14 records, respectively.

Sam Williams era (1959–1973)
Sam Williams took over the program in 1958. During that season, he led them to a 12–11 record, the first season with a winning record since 1952. The next year, he led them to a 17–9 record, and a 7–3 conference record, their first ever season with a winning conference record. Despite finishing with a 15–16 record, the Broncs made their first ever postseason appearance in 1961, playing in the NAIA District Playoffs. They were beaten in two games by Texas State, 83–64 and 73–72. In 1962, the Broncs finished with a 26–4 record. This time, the Broncs finally made their first NAIA Men's Basketball Tournament appearance after beating Texas State twice in a row, 71–68 and 67–61. The Broncs got to the second round before losing to the Ferris Institute. This was their final season in the Big State Conference, with the Broncs becoming an Independent after the season ended.

The Broncs finished 25–6 in the 1962–63 season. They beat McMurry 77–51 in the NAIA District Playoffs to make their second straight NAIA National Tournament appearance. The Broncs subsequently won the 1963 NAIA Division I men's basketball tournament, winning five games by an average margin of 20.4 points. Lucious Jackson was awarded the Chuck Taylor Most Valuable Player Award for his 93 rebounds in 5 games for an average of 18.6 rebounds per game.

The following year, the Broncs finished with a 28–6 record, the most victories the team ever had in a season. Once again, the Broncs prevailed in the NAIA District Playoffs, beating McMurray 86–81 to advance to the Tournament again. The Broncs went to the NAIA national championship once again, but they lost to Rockhurst. Despite the loss, Lucious Jackson was awarded the Chuck Taylor Most Valuable Player Award once again, for his 67 rebounds in 5 games (for a 13.4 rebounds per game average) and his 124 total points for a 24.8 game average. In his three tournaments, he scored a total of 301 points and 180 rebounds. In 1965, the Broncs finished 19–7, but they failed to advance past the NAIA District Playoffs in three games, including the final game by one point in Edinburg. The following year, they finished 15–12, but lost in the NAIA District Playoffs again, this time to Midwestern State, 81–77 and 84–75. A 15–9 season the following year failed to yield another shot at the District Playoffs.

In 1968, the Broncs (which had become Pan American University in 1965) qualified for the 1968 NCAA College Division men's basketball tournament with a 21–6 record culminated by a 19–3 end to a season that had zero losses at home. They were placed in the Southwestern Region. They beat Jackson State 96–73 to reach the regional final and potentially be one of the last 16 teams in the national finals. However, they lost to Trinity in overtime, 87–83. This was their last Tournament appearance of any kind until 1981. Since 1962, the Broncs had dual membership with the NAIA and NCAA Division II, but they transitioned into Division I before the 1968–69 season. That year, the team fell to 9–16. The following year resulted in one less win, but the 1970–71 season bounced back to a 13–13 record; this was the team's first .500 record in Division I play. The team finished 17–7 the following year, but did not qualify for any postseason. The team fell to rock bottom in 1972–73, winning only 4 games in their worst season since 1956. This was the final season for Williams. During his 15-year tenure, Williams had led the team to 11 winning seasons, with four 20-win seasons. His 244 victories is still the most in program history. Decades later, the university rededicated the center court of the fieldhouse in honor of Williams.

Abe Lemons years (1973–1976)
Abe Lemons took over the program to begin the 1973 season, which ended with a 13–9 outcome. The following year, he led them to a 22–2 record, the most since the 1967 season. In his third (and last) season, he led them to a 20–5 record. After the season, he left to take the job at Texas.

Bill White era (1976–1982)
Bill White took over as coach to begin the 1976 season, and he led them to a 16–10 record. The following year, the team improved to a 22–4 record. After a 13–13 season in 1978, the team joined the Trans America Athletic Conference (now known as the Atlantic Sun Conference) for the 1979–80 season, going 20–8 and 4–2 in conference play. However, they reverted to Independent status after the season ended. In 1980, the Broncs finished 19–10, but the season was highlighted by victories over eventual champion Indiana, defending champion Marquette, and eventual Sweet Sixteen participant Wichita State. They appeared in the 1980 TAAC men's basketball tournament, beating Hardin–Simmons in the Quarterfinals, but losing to eventual conference champion Centenary in the semifinals. They were rewarded for their season with an appearance in the National Invitation Tournament. They lost to Tulsa 81–71. This was their last appearance in a postseason for the team until 2018, and it was also their final year in the TAAC before reverting to independence. After losing all five senior starters, the team finished 5–20 season the following year, and White was subsequently replaced by Lon Kruger.

Lon Kruger era (1982–1986)
Lon Kruger led the team to a 7–21 record in 1982, but they improved every subsequent season, to 13–14 in 1983, to 12–16 in 1984, to 20–8 in 1985. Kruger left for Kansas State after the season ended.

Kevin Wall era (1986–1992)
In Wall's first year, the team finished 15–13, in their last season as an Independent before joining the American South Conference to begin the 1987–88 season. After two seasons of teetering on .500 (14–14, 4–7 in conference) and above .500 (15–13, 4–6 in conference), the Broncs finished 21–9 in 1989, with a 7–3 conference record, the most wins since 1977. However, the next two seasons ended with losing seasons of 7–21 and 4–25 (with 2 conference wins in total), and Wall was fired. The American South Conference merged with the Sun Belt Conference after 1991, and the Broncs stayed within the conference.

The Wall era saw another change in the school name; during the 1989 offseason, Pan American joined the University of Texas System and became the University of Texas–Pan American.

Mark Adams era (1992–1997)
The team's woes continued in the first season under Adams, finishing with a 2–20 record (with a 2–16 conference record), their worst season since 1954. However, they improved to 16–12 (along with a 9–9 conference record) the following year. After a 14–14 season in 1994, they dropped to 9–19 the next year, but dropped even further in 1996, falling to 3–25, with only one conference win. In March 1996, the University acknowledged violations by the men's basketball program, specifically the conduct of illegal off-campus camps for basketball, free medical treatment for players and disregarding instructions by both the school and the NCAA on procedures of investigation. Adams was fired after the season ended.

Delray Brooks years (1997–1999)
Delray Brooks coached the team to a 3–24 record in their final season with the Sun Belt Conference in 1997, and led the team to a 5–22 season the following year. On August 23, 1999, Brooks was fired. Notably, less than two months later Brooks was indicted by a grand jury on a felony theft charge for an allegation regarding depositing a $25,000 check from Southwest Missouri State into his personal account and subsequently making withdrawals from the account. He denied making the deposit or instructing a third party to do so, although he consents that the alleged $25,000 was added to his account. Less than a year later, he pleaded no contest and received 10 years of probation.

Bob Hoffman era (1999–2004)
After two seasons of 12 victories each, he led the team to a 20–10 finish in 2001, their first season over .500 since 1993. They plummeted to 10–20 the following year, and he finished his tenure with a 14–14 finish.

Robert Davenport years (2004–2006)
Davenport led the team to a 12–16 record for the first time since 1999 in his first season. A 7–24 record in his second season proved to be his last season with the Broncs.

Tom Schuberth years (2006–2009)
Tom Schuberth led the team to a 15–15 record in his first season, their first .500 team in three years. They improved to 18–13 the following year, the most victories since 2001. However, they finished 10–17 in 2008, and Schuberth's contract was not renewed after the season. Subsequently, it was found out that during his tenure, over 44 impermissible calls were made to 13 student-athletes from 2006 to 2008, along with paying inducements to one student-athlete, who also supervised workouts with an UTPA coach. It was found that the University had started their investigation in September 2008, which led to giving themselves a two-year probation sanction (starting in 2010), with the NCAA accepting UTPA's self-imposed penalties and choosing not to impose additional sanctions.

Ryan Marks era (2009–2013)
With the advent of a new coach came an acceptance into the Great West Conference, the first time the Broncs had been affiliated with a conference since 1997. Marks' two first seasons ended with 6 victories each before a slight improvement to 11–21 in 2011. Despite the team rising to a 16–16 overall record (and 5 victories in 8 conference games) the following year, his contract was not renewed.

Dan Hipsher era (2013–2016)
Alabama assistant coach Dan Hipsher, who previously served as head coach at Akron, Stetson, and Division III Wittenburg, was hired in 2013. The Broncs joined the Western Athletic Conference prior to the 2013 season. That year, they finished 9–23, with a 5–11 conference record. In their final season under the Bronc identity, the team finished 10–21 overall, with a 4–10 conference record, though they did win their final home game as the Broncs vs UMKC, highlighted with a buzzer beater 2-point shot as time expired. The 2015–16 season was their first season as the UTRGV Vaqueros, and they finished the season 8–22, with a 4–10 conference record. The school removed Hipsher from his head coaching position on March 15, 2016.

Lew Hill era (2016–2021)
Oklahoma assistant coach Lew Hill was named the new head coach on March 31, 2016. In his first season at UTRGV, the team finished 10–22 overall, with a 2–12 conference record. In the 2017–18 season, the Vaqueros went 15–16 while winning going 6–8 in WAC play before losing in the Quarterfinals to Seattle. This was the most wins by the team since the 2012-13 season in which they won 16 games. The Vaqueros were invited to the 2018 College Basketball Invitational, their first postseason berth since 1980, where they lost to New Orleans in the first round.

The following season, the Vaqueros improved. They went 19–16 in the regular season while going 9–7 in WAC play. This is the first winning season for the team since the 2007-08 team along with the first time they achieved a winning conference record since 1994-95. The Vaqueros were invited to the 2019 CollegeInsider.com Postseason Tournament. This is the program's first CIT appearance along with their second consecutive season with a postseason bid, the first for the program since the 1963 & 1964 seasons. They were designated to host the first round game vs Grambling on March 20, the first time UTRGV has hosted a postseason tournament game since hosting a game in the NAIA District Playoffs in 1965 and the first at the UTRGV Fieldhouse. Facing off against, the Vaqueros narrowly won 74-73, winning on a pair of free throws with nine seconds remaining. It is their first postseason victory since 1968. They will move on to play Texas Southern on March 25, once again hosting.

Hill died at age 56 on February 7, 2021, late in his fifth season as coach.

Matt Figger era (2021–present)

On March 29, 2021, Matt Figger was named the new head coach of the Vaqueros.

All-Time Statistical Leaders

Career leaders

Single season leaders
Points scored: 919 (Marshall Rogers – 1975–76)
Assists: 323 (John Wilbanks – 1977–78)
Rebounds: 626 (Lucious Jackson – 1962–63)
Steals: 105 (Mire Chatman – 2001–02)
Blocks: 120 (Pete Perry – 1972–73)

Single game leaders
Points scored: 58 (Marshall Rogers vs Texas Lutheran – 1976)
Assists: 22 (John Wilbanks vs Arkansas State – 1977)
Rebounds: 35 (Otto Moore vs Lamar Tech – 1966)
Steals: 10 (John Wilbanks vs Texas A&I – 1977)
Blocks: 11 (Pete Perry vs Lamar – 1972)

All-time season results
Results accurate as of the end of the 2017–18 season.

Coaching historyStats updated as of the end of 2020–21 season''

Conference history

Postseason

NIT results
The Vaqueros have appeared in one National Invitation Tournament (NIT) as the Pan American Broncs, losing their only game.

CBI results
UTRGV has appeared in one College Basketball Invitational (CBI). They have a record of 0–1.

CIT results
UTRGV has appeared in one CollegeInsider.com Postseason Tournament (CIT). Their record is 1–1.

NCAA Division II
During their time as Pan American, they appeared in the NCAA Division II men's basketball tournament (then known as the NCAA College Division basketball tournament) once. The Broncs (now known as the Vaqueros) went 1–1.

NAIA results
During their time as Pan American, they appeared in the NAIA Men's Basketball Championships three times, going a combined record of 10–2, including an NAIA title.

Retired numbers
UTRGV has retired three jersey numbers. On February 16, 2019, the Vaqueros retired Fred Taylor's 30 jersey.

Vaqueros of note
The Vaqueros have had 18 of its player selected in the NBA draft, with six of them playing in the National Basketball Association (NBA).

References

External links